Mudassar Riaz (born 2 September 1995) is a Pakistani cricketer. He made his List A debut for Sui Northern Gas Pipelines Limited in the 2016–17 Departmental One Day Cup on 27 December 2016.

References

External links
 

1995 births
Living people
Pakistani cricketers
Sui Northern Gas Pipelines Limited cricketers
Cricketers from Faisalabad